Laurent Sebastien Lopes de Matos (born 7 March 1997) is a French Guianan professional footballer who plays as a right-back or right midfielder for ŁKS Łagów.

Career statistics

Club

Notes

International

References

1997 births
Living people
People from Kourou
French Guianan footballers
French Guiana international footballers
Association football forwards
Tercera División players
Tercera Federación players
FC Girondins de Bordeaux players
CD Ciudad de Lucena players
Écija Balompié players
CD Gerena players
UD Lanzarote players
French Guianan expatriate footballers
Expatriate footballers in France
Expatriate footballers in Spain
Expatriate footballers in Poland